ICA Banken is a Swedish bank established in February 2002. It is owned by the retail chain ICA AB and offers financial services to Swedish customers. ICA Banken makes it easier for customers of ICA's Swedish stores to manage their finances and in the process strengthens their ties to ICA. ICA Banken estimates that around 500,000 customers use its banking services. And is one of the 20 biggest banks in Sweden.

External links
ICA Banken - about ICA Banken at ICA's homepage

References 

Banks of Sweden
Supermarket banks
Banks established in 2002
2002 establishments in Sweden